Brinckerhoff is a hamlet and census-designated place (CDP) in Dutchess County, New York, United States. The population was 2,900 at the 2010 census. It is part of the Poughkeepsie–Newburgh–Middletown, NY Metropolitan Statistical Area as well as the larger New York–Newark–Bridgeport, NY-NJ-CT-PA Combined Statistical Area.

Brinckerhoff is in the northeastern corner of the town of Fishkill, northeast of the village of Fishkill.

Geography
Brinckerhoff is located in southwestern Dutchess County at  (41.550393, -73.869501). Most of the community is in the northeastern section of the town of Fishkill, but a small part extends north into the southeastern corner of the town of Wappinger.

Demographics

As of the census of 2000, there were 2,734 people, 999 households, and 767 families residing in the CDP. The population density was 2,518.5 per square mile (968.4/km2). There were 1,006 housing units at an average density of 926.7/sq mi (356.3/km2). The racial makeup of the CDP was 89.72% White, 4.50% African American, 0.04% Native American, 4.61% Asian, 0.48% from other races, and 0.66% from two or more races. Hispanic or Latino of any race were 5.49% of the population.

There were 999 households, out of which 34.0% had children under the age of 18 living with them, 66.4% were married couples living together, 7.1% had a female householder with no husband present, and 23.2% were non-families. 20.1% of all households were made up of individuals, and 7.9% had someone living alone who was 65 years of age or older. The average household size was 2.74 and the average family size was 3.17.

In the CDP, the population was spread out, with 24.3% under the age of 18, 6.1% from 18 to 24, 29.0% from 25 to 44, 27.7% from 45 to 64, and 12.9% who were 65 years of age or older. The median age was 39 years. For every 100 females, there were 96.4 males. For every 100 females age 18 and over, there were 90.5 males.

The median income for a household in the CDP was $65,994, and the median income for a family was $68,030. Males had a median income of $55,678 versus $26,737 for females. The per capita income for the CDP was $26,706. About 1.3% of families and 3.0% of the population were below the poverty line, including 5.9% of those under age 18 and none of those age 65 or over.

References

Fishkill, New York
Census-designated places in New York (state)
Hamlets in New York (state)
Poughkeepsie–Newburgh–Middletown metropolitan area
Census-designated places in Dutchess County, New York
Hamlets in Dutchess County, New York